Abbas Ranjbar is a contemporary film composer, director and producer of several movies and shows for private companies and IRIB organization in Iran.

Biography 

Abbas Ranjbar was born in 1960 in Tehran, Iran. He received his bachelor's degree in Visual Arts from the University of Tehran in 1982, his master's degree in cultural management from the Allameh Tabataba'i University in 1985. He serves as a faculty member of  Iran's Academic Center for Education, Culture and Research, the director of Sadaf Film, a leading private film making company and a member of the visual effects institute, Faradid Group. Ranjbar has a daughter and a son, who are both married.

Career history 
 Head of Artwork office of Iran's Academic Center for Education, Culture and Research at Sharif University of Technology, 1988-1991.
 Head of department of Television at the central office of Iran's Academic Center for Education, Culture and Research, 1991-1996.
 Founder and Dean of the academic institute Rasaam Higher Education Institute, 1995-2000.
 Administrative Assistant of cultural section in Tehran municipality, 1998-2000.
 Designer and consultant for cultural houses for towns in Tehran, 1999-2002.

Awards and honors 
Abbas Ranjbar has participated in numerous film and theater festivals as a jury member. Also his works have been nominated in several festivals. Hereunder are some representatives:

 Golden Statuette Award as the best director for the theater play Purple Cloak in the 2nd Fadjr international theater festival
 Golden Statuette Award for the best play and the best director for the theater play Gray bundles in the 5th Fadjr international theater festival
 A plaque for the film Tiam in short films festival, Isfahan, 2007.

References

Living people
1960 births
Iranian film score composers
University of Tehran alumni
People from Tehran
Iranian film directors
Iranian film producers